The Tariff of 1832 (22nd Congress, session 1, ch. 227, enacted July 14, 1832) was a protectionist tariff in the United States. Enacted under Andrew Jackson's presidency, it was largely written by former President John Quincy Adams, who had been elected to the House of Representatives and appointed chairman of the Committee on Manufactures. It reduced the existing tariffs to remedy the conflict created by the Tariff of 1828, but it was still deemed unsatisfactory by some in the South, especially in South Carolina. South Carolinian opposition to this tariff and its predecessor, the Tariff of Abominations, caused the Nullification Crisis.  As a result of this crisis, the 1832 Tariff was replaced by the Compromise Tariff of 1833.

The Tariff of 1832
Enacted on July 13, 1832, this was referred to as a protectionist tariff in the United States. The purpose of this tariff was to act as a remedy for the conflict created by the Tariff of 1828. The protective Tariff of 1828 was primarily created to protect the rapidly growing industry-based economy of the North. Because of this, the Tariff of 1828 was also called the Tariff of Abominations by Southern states, as it seemed unfair on the part of the government to favor the North's economic and sociopolitical power by forcefully reducing the value of the South's agricultural-based economy by imposing excessive tariffs on goods imported by the South. As compared to the gross economic disparity created by the protective Tariff of 1832, it proved to be an unsatisfactory measure by Northern politicians to quell the protests rising from the South. Its predecessor pushed the duties on citizens which were as high as 45 percent on the value of specific manufactured goods, while the Tariff of 1832 act brought it down to 35%. For instance, the tariffs on hemp, which had been raised to $60 a ton in 1828, was reduced to a $40 a ton in 1832, as a result of a tariff enacted that same year by a Northern-dominated federal congress. Even then Southerners were not happy with it. Eventually, their unrest and dissatisfaction was what led to the nullification crisis. Along with that, another bill was passed, Tariff of 1833.

Tariff of 1832 and Nullification Crisis
The Southern states remained displeased with the high rates of the Tariff of 1832. As a result, in 1833, a sectional crisis, called the Nullification Crisis happened during the presidency of Andrew Jackson. In South Carolina's Ordinance of nullification, by the power of the state, the Federal Tariffs of 1828 and 1832 were declared unconstitutional in November 1832. As a result, they were null and void within the 'sovereign' boundaries of South Carolina, because the reductions provided for in the Tariff of 1832 were too little for South Carolina. Due to the precarious economic situation during the 1820s, South Carolina was the state which had particularly borne the brunt of the economic downturn. The result was that by 1828, the politics of South Carolina increasingly revolved around the issue of tariffs. In Washington, the President and the Vice President differed on the issue. John Calhoun, the Vice President, later quit his office to defend the nullification process. In 1833, a bill authorizing the President the use of military forces against South Carolina was passed as a preemptive measure. Consequently, negotiations led to a tariff satisfactory to South Carolina being passed. Finally, South Carolina repealed its Nullification Ordinance in 1833 on March 26.

House vote

References

Further reading
Taussig, Frank. Tariff History of the United States (1912) online

1832 in American law
1832 in the United States
Nullification crisis
United States federal taxation legislation
1832
July 1832 events